Dangerhouse Records was a  punk music record label based in Los Angeles, California.

Overview 
Dangerhouse was one of the first independent labels to document the burgeoning West Coast punk rock scene. Started in 1977 and collapsing by the end of 1980, it was a short-lived enterprise, which nonetheless left an indelible mark on the punk rock history.

Established by David Brown and Pat "Rand" Garrett, both members of the punk rock band Black Randy and the Metrosquad, the company operated on a limited budget, supported by the more conventional typesetting and aerospace jobs of the founders. Black Randy himself got a day job in telemarketing and joined the effort as a business partner.

Despite its scarce resources, Dangerhouse was notable for its production quality. They released records on many of California's finest first-wave punk bands, including X, The Eyes, The Bags, The Alley Cats, Avengers, the Weirdos, and the Dils.

Discord, a lack of financial reward, and big label competition are cited as the reasons for the demise of the company.

Discography 
In its brief existence, Dangerhouse Records put out only 14 7-inch vinyl records, one LP, and one compilation 12-inch EP.

See also 
 List of record labels

Notes

References

External links 
 Richardson, Ryan. Dangerhouse Records, in-depth history and complete commented discography (page 1/2). Break My Face.
 Frontier Records: Dangerhouse compilations. Frontier Records.
 Dangerhouse Records, cover art. Record Collectors of the World Unite.
 Dangerhouse Records, discography. Discogs.
 Dangerhouse Records, discography. Punky Gibbon.

American record labels
Defunct record labels of the United States
Record labels established in 1977
Record labels disestablished in 1980
Punk record labels
1977 establishments in California
Companies based in Los Angeles